Raphaël Llodra (born July 29, 1992) is a French Muay Thai Fighter. He is the former WBC Muaythai Middleweight World Champion and the former WMC Middleweight Intercontinental champion.

Muaythai career
Llodra won the WMC Intercontinental title (-72 kg) from Marco Piqué at "Best of Siam 3" in Paris, on February 14, 2013.

He became the WBC middleweight World Champion in La Riche, France, by beating Jacub Gazdik on March 9, 2013.

Raphaël won an ISKA World Champion Belt against Sua Dam in Bagnolet, on May 4, 2013.

Llodra won a split decision against Panom Topkingboxing at Best of Siam 4 in Paris, France, on June 20, 2013.

He lost a close decision to Bernueng TopKingboxing in Bangkok at the Queen's cup 2013. The fight was for the WPMF World Title.

He fought Diogo Calado, during Enfusion 33, for the Enfusion 75 kg title. Llodra lost the fight by third round TKO.

He met Saiyok Pumpanmuang at Thai Fight Paris on April 8, 2017 and won by unanimous decision.

Titles 
2013 ISKA World Muay Thai Champion (73 kg)
2013 WBC World Muaythai Middleweight champion (160 lbs/72.5 kg)
2013 WMC Muay Thai Intercontinental champion (72 kg)
2011 FMDA French Muay Thai champion Class B (75 kg)

Professional Muaythai record

|-  style="background:#cfc;"
| 2018-05-19 || Win ||align=left| Ni Shi || Wu Lin Feng 2018: World Championship Yichun|| China || KO || 2 ||
|-  style="background:#fbb;"
|-  style="background:#cfc;"
| 2018-04-07 || Win ||align=left| Jose Neto || Longyao dongfang || Weifang, China || Decision || 3
|-
|- style="background:#fbb;"
| 2017-05-06 || Loss ||align=left| Pavol Garaj || Enfusion Live 50 || Žilina, Slovakia || TKO (Referee stoppage) || 1 || 
|-  style="background:#cfc;"
| 2017-04-08 || Win ||align=left| Saiyok Pumpanmuang || Thaï Fight || Paris, France || Decision || 3 || 
|-  style="background:#cfc;"
| 2016-11-19 || Win ||align=left| Wang Anying || WLF Rise of Heroes|| Martigny, Switzerland || KO || 2 ||
|-  style="background:#fbb;"
| 2015-11-07 || Loss ||align=left| Diogo Calado || Enfusion Live 33  || Martigny, Switzerland ||  TKO (Referee stoppage) || 3 || 
|-
! style=background:white colspan=9 |
|-
|- style="background:#cfc;"
| 2015-06-19 || Win ||align=left| Samy Sana || Best of Siam VI || Paris, France || Decision (decision was changed due to dope-test failure) || 5 ||
|-  style="background:#cfc;"
| 2015-04-18 || Win ||align=left| Maximo Suarez || Enfusion Live || Tenerife || Decision || 3 ||
|-  style="background:#cfc;"
| 2015-03-07 || Win ||align=left| Kamel Mezatni || Le Choc des Légendes || Saint-Ouen, France || TKO (Doctor Stop) || 3 ||
|-  style="background:#cfc;"
| 2014-01-25 || Win ||align=left| Mohamed Houmer || La Ligue des Gladiateurs || Paris, France || TKO (Throw in the Towel) || 2 ||
|- style="background:#fbb;"
| 2013-12-14 || Loss ||align=left| Mohamed Diaby || Victory K-1 Tournament || Levallois, France || Decision || 3 ||
|-  style="background:#cfc;"
| 2013-12-14 || Win ||align=left| Philippe Salmon || Victory K-1 Tournament || Levallois, France || Decision || 3 ||
|- style="background:#fbb;"
| 2013-08-11 || Loss ||align=left| Berneung Topkingboxing || Queen's Cup || Bangkok, Thailand || Decision || 5 || 
|-
! style=background:white colspan=9 |
|-  style="background:#cfc;"
| 2013-06-20 || Win ||align=left| Panom Topkingboxing || Best of Siam 4 || Paris, France || Decision (split) || 5|| 
|-
|-  style="background:#cfc;"
| 2013-05-04 || Win ||align=left| Sua Dam || La Nuit des Revanches || Bagnolet, France || KO (Knee) || 1
|-
! style=background:white colspan=9 |
|-  style="background:#cfc;"
| 2013-03-09 || Win ||align=left| Jakub Gazdík || Grande Soirée de la Boxe || La Riche, France || KO (Knee) || 1 || 
|-
! style=background:white colspan=9 |
|-  style="background:#cfc;"
| 2013-02-14 || Win ||align=left| Marco Piqué || Best of Siam 3 || Paris, France || TKO (Gave Up) || 4 || 3:00
|-
! style=background:white colspan=9 |
|- style="background:#fbb;"
| 2012-12-08 || Loss ||align=left| Vladimír Moravčík || Fight Explosion || Bratislava, Slovakia || Decision || 3 || 
|-  style="background:#cfc;"
| 2012-11-22 || Win ||align=left| Wendy Annonay || Best of Siam 2 || Paris, France || TKO (Doctor Stop) || 2 ||
|-  style="background:#cfc;"
| 2012-10-20 || Win ||align=left| Sébastien Billiard || La Nuit de la Boxe Thai IV || Tours, France || TKO (Throw in the towel) || 3 ||
|- style="background:#fbb;"
| 2012-09-19 || Loss ||align=left| Armin Pumpanmuang Windy Sport || Thai Fight || Lyon, France || TKO (cut) || 3 || 
|-  style="background:#cfc;"
| 2012-06-23 || Win ||align=left| Wendy Annonay || Showthai Round 5 || Aubervilliers, France || TKO (Gave up) || 2 ||
|-  style="background:#cfc;"
| 2012-06-02 || Win ||align=left| Max Dansan || La Nuit des Challenges 11 || Saint-Fons, France || TKO (Gave up) || 3 || 3:00
|- style="background:#fbb;"
| 2012-04-28 || Loss ||align=left| Super X || Tournoi des 4 Continents  || Bagnolet, France || Decision || 3 || 
|-  style="background:#cfc;"
| 2012-04-28 || Win ||align=left| Moussa Konaté || Tournoi des 4 Continents  || Bagnolet, France || TKO (Referee Stoppage) || 3 ||
|-  style="background:#cfc;"
| 2012-03-22 || Win ||align=left| Radompol PatongBoxingGym|| Patong Boxing Stadium || Phuket, Thailand || TKO (Referee stopagge) || 3
|-
|-  style="background:#cfc;"
| 2012-03-07 || Win ||align=left||| Bangla stadium || Phuket, Thailand || KO (knee) || 1
|-
|-  style="background:#cfc;"
| 2011-12-05 || Win ||align=left| Rajan Sasiprapa || King's Cup || Bangkok, Thailand || TKO (Referee stoppage) || 2
|-
|-  style="background:#cfc;"
| 2011-11-14 || Win ||align=left| Tahan Ek || Patong boxing stadium || Phuket, Thailand || KO (knee) || 3
|-
|-  style="background:#cfc;"
| 2011-10-23 || Win ||align=left| Taylor Krahl Tiger MuayThai || Bangla stadium Anniversary || Phuket, Thailand || TKO (Referee Stoppage) || 2
|- style="background:#fbb;"
|- style="background:#fbb;"
| 2011-09-25 || Loss ||align=left| Chanaek PK MuayThai || Thai Fight || Bangkok, Thailand || Decision || 3 || 
|-  style="background:#cfc;"
| 2011-08-29 || Win ||align=left| Chris KYN MuayThai|| Patong boxing stadium || Phuket, Thailand || Decision || 5
|-
|-  style="background:#cfc;"
| 2011-08-11 || Win ||align=left||| Queen's Cup || Bangkok, Thailand || KO (elbow) || 1
|- style="background:#fbb;"
| 2011-07-27 || Loss ||align=left||| Bangla stadium || Phuket, Thailand || Decision || 5 || 
|-  style="background:#cfc;"
| 2011-07-18 || Win ||align=left||| Patong boxing stadium || Phuket, Thailand || TKO (Throw in the towel) || 1
|-
|-  style="background:#cfc;"
| 2011-04-23 || Win ||align=left| Mamadou Coulibaly || Le Choc des Ceintures || Villiers-sur-Marne, France || Decision || 3 ||
|-
|-  style="background:#cfc;"
| 2011-04-09 || Win ||align=left| Nicolas Ravenelle || FMDA French Championship Class B || Paris, France || Decision || 4 || 
|-
! style=background:white colspan=9 |
|-  style="background:#cfc;"
| 2011-03-13 || Win ||align=left| Brahima Camara || FMDA French Championship Class B || Paris, France || Decision || 4 ||
|-  style="background:#cfc;"
| 2011-02-05 || Win ||align=left| Nicolas Ravenelle || FMDA French Championship Class B || Athis-Mons, France || KO || 1 ||
|-
|- style="background:#fbb;"
| 2011-01-29 || Loss ||align=left| Christian Zahe || Thai Boxe Mania || Turin, Italia || TKO (Referee stoppage) || 1 || 
|-
| colspan=9 | Legend:

See also 
List of male kickboxers

References

External links
Raphaël Llodra profile

1992 births
Living people
French male kickboxers
Welterweight kickboxers
French Muay Thai practitioners